The 1969 Memorial Cup was the 51st annual Memorial Cup competition, organized by the Canadian Amateur Hockey Association (CAHA) to determine the champion of junior A ice hockey. The George Richardson Memorial Trophy champions Montreal Jr. Canadiens of the Ontario Hockey Association in Eastern Canada competed against the Abbott Cup champions Regina Pats of the Saskatchewan Junior Hockey League in Western Canada. The best-of-seven series was held at the Montreal Forum in Montreal, Quebec and at the Regina Exhibition Stadium in Regina, Saskatchewan.  Montreal won their 2nd Memorial Cup, defeating Regina 4 games to 0.

Scores
Game 1: Montreal 5-3 Regina
Game 2: Montreal 7-2 Regina
Game 3: Montreal 5-2 Regina
Game 4: Montreal 8-6 Regina

Winning roster
Players: Jean-Pierre Bordeleau, Guy Charron, Gary Connelly, Andre Dupont, Jocelyn Guevremont, Robert Guindon, Normand Gratton, Rejean Houle, Serge Lajeunesse, Robert Lalonde, Richard Lemieux, Rick Martin, Claude Moreau, Gilbert Perreault, Arthur Quoquochi, Jim Rutherford, Marc Tardif, Ted Tucker, Wayne Wood. Coach: Roger Bedard.

National playoffs

Additional interleague playdowns
Sorel Black Hawks defeated Port Alfred Nationale 3-games-to-none (Quebec SF)
Sorel Black Hawks defeated St. Jerome Alouettes 3-games-to-none (Quebec Final)

League champions

Western Canada - Abbott Cup playdowns
British Columbia (BC)
BCJHL: Victoria Cougars
Alberta (AB)
AJHL: Lethbridge Sugar Kings
Saskatchewan (SK)
SJHL: Regina Pats
Manitoba (MB)
MJHL: Dauphin Kings
Northwestern Ontario (NWO)
NWOJHL: Schreiber North Stars
TBJHL: Fort William Westfort Hurricanes

Eastern Canada - George Richardson Memorial Trophy playdowns
Ontario (ON)
Eastern Ontario (EO) - CJHL: Hull Beavers
Northeastern Ontario (NEO) - NOJHA: Sudbury Wolves
Southern Ontario (SO) - OHA: Montreal Junior Canadiens
Quebec (QC)
LHJP: Sorel Black Hawks
LHJSLS: Port Alfred Nationale
LHJMM: St. Jerome Alouettes
Atlantic Canada (AC)
MJAHL: Fredericton Canadiens

References

External links
 Memorial Cup
 Canadian Hockey League

Mem
Memorial Cup tournaments
Ice hockey competitions in Montreal
Ice hockey competitions in Regina, Saskatchewan